Dance Party in the Balkans is the debut album of the American electronic band Alaska in Winter, released in 2007.

Track listing 

 "The Homeless and the Hummingbirds" – 2:57
 "Your Red Dress (Wedding Song At Cemetery)" – 2:50
 "The beautiful burial flowers we will never see" – 3:03
 "Balkan Lowrider Anthem" – 2:23
 "Lovely Love Love" – 3:23
 "Twenty Four Hours in Lake of Ice" – 3:30
 "Dance Party in the Balkans" – 2:45
 "Harmonijak" – 2:59
 "Staring At The Sun" – 3:36
 "Horsey Horse" – 3:17
 "Rain on Every Weekend" - 5:44
 "Don't Read Dostoyevsky" - 3:47
 "Close Your Eyes - We Are Blind" - 5:26

References

External links 
 Alaska in Winter on Myspace

2007 debut albums
Alaska in Winter albums